The Philippine Navy is expecting the delivery of six new offshore patrol vessels acquired under its Offshore Patrol Vessel Acquisition Project under the Revised AFP Modernization Program's Horizon 2 phase covering years 2018 to 2022.

The Philippines' Department of National Defense (DND) signed a contract with South Korean shipbuilder Hyundai Heavy Industries on 27 June 2022, with the shipbuilder delivering a variant of their HDP-2200+ offshore patrol vessel design.

The ships are not yet named, and construction is expected to start by 2022.

Development

Concept Design
The Philippine Navy included plans to procure 6 new next generation offshore patrol vessels as part of its Horizon 2 modernization phase, with the proposal with a budget of PHP30billion (US$555 million) among those approved in-principle by Philippine President Rodrigo Duterte in June 2018.

During the pre-procurement development phase, the Technical Working Group (TWG) assigned for the project has used the Philippine Navy's experience in specifying and building its latest warship, the Jose Rizal-class frigate, as there were numerous lessons learned from the project's development and construction from 2016 to 2020.

Based on open source information, the new patrol vessels would be smaller, less equipped and less armed than frigates and corvettes, and designed more for low to medium intensity conflicts and peacetime operations.

Sensors were believed to include the following:
 an improved combat management system (CMS) compared to the one installed on the Jose Rizal-class frigate;
 a 2D air/surface search radar system;
 a secondary surface search/navigation radar system;
 a fire control radar (FCR);
 an electro-optical tracking system (EOTS);
 a radar electronic support measures (R-ESM) system;
 a radio detection finder (RDF);
 no sonar system

Weapon systems will include the following:
 an Oto Melara 76mm Super Rapid naval gun, carried over for commonality with other existing ships;
 two 30mm secondary naval guns, either the Aselsan SMASH, MSI Defence DS30, Rafael Typhoon, or BAE Systems Mk.38 Mk.2, all of which are already in service with the Philippine Navy;
 two manually-operated 12.7mm heavy machine guns;
 fitted for but not with anti-ship missile systems;
 fitted for but not with two twin missile launchers for short range air-to-air missiles, like the MBDA Simbad-RC;
 two triple lightweight anti-submarine torpedo launchers

Selection

Several offers were made to the Philippine Navy to meet the requirements for new OPVs, including proposals coming from South Korea's Hyundai Heavy Industries, Turkey's ASFAT, Israel Shipyards, Thailand's Bangkok Dock Company, France's Naval Group, Dutch shipbuilder Damen Group, and India's Goa Shipyard.

The Department of National Defense eventually decided for the project to be procured under negotiated process, and undertaken through Government-to-Government (G2G) process, which means a support and participation of the government of the shipbuilder's country of origin.

By 2021, South Korea's Hyundai Heavy Industries and Turkey's ASFAT were shortlisted for the project. HHI offered their HDP-1500 Neo patrol vessel design. On the other hand, ASFAT offered a revised version of their VARD-7 86-meter patrol vessel design.

Ultimately, Hyundai Heavy Industries was selected as the winning contractor for the project, with a Notice of Award released by the DND around May or June 2022, and a contract signed on 27 June 2022.

HHI HDP-2200+ design
During the contract signing with the Philippine Department of National Defense, Hyundai Heavy Industries indicated that their offer will be based on their 2,400-ton HDP-2400 corvette design. It is an enlarged and improved design of the HDP-1500 Neo which was believed to be the benchmark of HHI's offer to the Philippines, and was first unveiled at the International Maritime Defense Industry Exhibition (MADEX) 2022 in South Korea, with an enlarged hull and other improvements to fit the requirements of the Philippine Navy.

As Critical Design Review was conducted, HHI's designation on the OPV offered to the Philippine Navy was later changed to the HDP-2200+ OPV design, as confirmed by HHI during Euornaval 2022 defense exhibition in Paris, France in October 2022, The dimensions of the ship remains the same as before, but the change in design name indicates that the displacement may have been reduced from 2,400 tons to 2,200 tons.

The HDP-2200+ scale model shown at Euronaval 2022 shows that the patrol vessel will have a 76mm primary naval gun in A-position, and can potentially mix and match different weapon systems like medium caliber 30mm guns in remote controlled stations, close-in weapon stations, short range surface-to-air missile launchers, and anti-ship missiles. The final weapon systems content for the Philippines has not been announced yet.

The ships would also have a hangar and helicopter landing deck, and a rear ramp for Rigid Hull Inflatable Boats (RHIB), and spaces for Multi-Mission Containerized Modules to allow the ships to conduct other roles.

Ships in class

Notes

See also
 List of equipment of the Philippine Navy

References 

Ships built by Hyundai Heavy Industries Group